Vallejo Station is an inter-modal transit station in Vallejo, California. It is located at the western part of Central Vallejo and includes the Vallejo Ferry Terminal, a multi-story parking garage/paseo, and the Vallejo Transit Center bus station.

The ferry terminal serves as a through stop and part-time terminal for the Vallejo Ferry, which travels between Mare Island and Pier 41 at Fisherman's Wharf in San Francisco, making stops at Vallejo and the San Francisco Ferry Building along the way, however, both Mare Island and Pier 41 are also part-time terminals for the ferry, and most trips on the ferry only serve Vallejo and the Ferry Building. Vallejo Ferry Terminal additionally serves as the northern terminal for the seasonal Vallejo Giants Ferry to Oracle Park. The Vallejo Giants Ferry only operates on weekday evenings and weekends for select Giants home games throughout the baseball season; weekday evening service only operates northbound from Oracle Park to Vallejo 20 minutes after the last out of the game, while weekend service operates bidirectionally between Vallejo and Oracle Park, also returning to Vallejo 20 minutes after the last out of the game. The Vallejo Ferry Terminal Ticket Office is open on weekdays between 5:30am and 5:00pm, and on weekends and holidays between 8:00am and 5:00pm.

The Vallejo Transit Center serves as the headquarters and central transfer point for SolTrans, with additional service to the bus station provided by Flixbus and VINE Transit. The Vallejo Convention and Visitor's Bureau headquarters is also located inside of the Ferry Terminal.

A California Historical Landmark marker at the transit center denotes the site of the former California State Capitol in Vallejo.

Bus service

The Vallejo Transit Center is a major terminal for the SolTrans and VINE Transit bus systems:
Soltrans: local routes 1, 2, 3, 4, 5, 6, & 7; express routes Red, Yellow, and 82.
VINE Transit: local route 11; express route 11X (stops at ferry terminal only).

Amtrak and Greyhound additionally provide intercity bus service from the terminal.

References

External links

Ferry terminals in the San Francisco Bay Area
Bus stations in Solano County, California
San Pablo Bay
Vallejo, California
California Historical Landmarks